Ducks Ltd. are a Canadian indie rock band from Toronto.

History
The group originated under the band name "Ducks Unlimited". Their first EP, Get Bleak, was released under that name. In April 2021, the band signed to both Carpark Records and Royal Mountain Records, where the aforementioned EP was re-released by the label. In October 2021, the group released their debut full-length album, Modern Fiction. In January 2022, the group released a new song titled Sheets Of Grey. Along with Illuminati Hotties, the band released a cover of Head On, by The Jesus and Mary Chain in March 2022.

References

Carpark Records artists
Royal Mountain Records artists